100 Girls is a 2000 American romantic comedy film written and directed by Michael Davis. It tells the story of a college student's (Jonathan Tucker) efforts to find a mystery girl with whom he had sex in an elevator during a blackout. It was released direct-to-video on September 25, 2001.

Plot
After leaving a party at a women's dormitory, Matthew (Jonathan Tucker) is trapped in an elevator with an unknown, and unseen, woman when the power goes out. They have sex in the dark and when Matthew wakes up in the elevator the morning after, he finds himself alone with a pair of her panties.

On a mission to find his mystery maiden by looking for a matching bra for the panties, Matthew becomes the maintenance man of the "Virgin Vault", an all-female dormitory. This allows him to investigate without drawing suspicion. His roommate Rod (James DeBello) keeps telling him to give up and introduces him to the "penile power", which involves the use of weights attached to his penis as a means of increasing the organ's size. He does this and insults women to make himself feel better about the problem he has with his manhood; he suffers from hypospadias.

Early on, Matthew watches as a woman named Patty (Emmanuelle Chriqui) and her boyfriend Crick (Johnny Green) fight. Crick is the epitome of the macho man stereotype, with his big pectorals, conceited attitude, and abusiveness. Matthew tries to save Patty, but is hurt by Crick. Crick leaves, and Patty tries to help Matthew, but Matthew can't help but think of Patty's reputation as a "slut".

While searching one room, Matthew finds himself trapped in the bathroom when the occupant returns. Matthew is attacked by Wendy (Larisa Oleynik), until she recognizes him as a high school classmate. Wendy decides to help Matthew in his quest to find his mystery maiden, hoping that, in the process, she may find one of her own, as she is a closeted lesbian.

Matthew is nervous about talking to girls. Arlene (Katherine Heigl) and his teacher Ms. Stern (Aimee Graham) disparage Matthew, asserting that women are more dominant than men are and that women, rather than men, should be in command. Rod tells Matthew that he's a chicken and should just give up on girls, while Matthew tells him that he has never been able to speak to girls, especially Cynthia (Jaime Pressly).

Matthew puts an advertisement in the school newspaper asking the girl he's seeking to meet him in the basement on a Thursday night. He sits in the dark every Thursday night, waiting for her to show up. The door opens one night, and he thinks it's her, but it's Wendy, coming to check up on him. Finally, the mystery maiden does show up, only to tell him to stop looking for her.

Despite this, Matthew isn't deterred, and disguises himself in drag, as Francesca, as a means to continue his search. In drag, he is actually able to talk to Cynthia without being intimidated by her good looks.  She then gets injured after two students accidentally drop a couch on her. Rod flirts with Francesca and later brags to Matthew that he had sex with her. This makes Matthew so angry that he adds another weight onto Rod's "penile power" device, hurting him. Crick makes a pass at Matthew in drag while he fights with Patty. Matthew bites off part of Crick's tongue. As a result, Crick is unable to speak without lisping.

With then end of the semester nearing, desperation sets in, so Matthew appeals to his mystery maiden by proclaiming his love for her to the whole dormitory. He finally determines his mystery maiden is Patty. She initially rejects him because she thought that he would see her only as a slut. Crick sees that Matthew wants Patty, but Matthew has him arrested for sexually assaulting him (when he was dressed as Francesca).

Matthew introduces Rod and Dora, and hooks Wendy up with Arlene. Cynthia shows off her newly found martial art abilities that she discovered as a way to cope with frustration following her injury, and Ms. Stern learns a valuable lesson on gender equality, as Matthew stands up to her in front of the class, to an ovation. Finally, Matthew proclaims his love to Patty, who sees his loving eyes, and they kiss.

Cast

 Jonathan Tucker as Matthew
 Emmanuelle Chriqui as Patty
 James DeBello as Rod
 Katherine Heigl as Arlene
 Larisa Oleynik as Wendy
 Jaime Pressly as Cynthia
 Marissa Ribisi as Dora

 Johnny Green as Crick

 Aimee Graham as Ms. Stern
 Ange Billman as Dana
 Kristina Anapau as Sasha
 Rainbeau Mars as Maureen
 Monica Huarte as Janeite #1
 Reilly McLaren as Janeite #2
 Kristin Herold as Barbara
 Anya Marina as Rhonda
 Josephine Angelini as Michelle
 Julieanne Steger as Penny
 Ivana Bozilovic as Rene
 Eric Szmanda as Sam
 Jennifer Ko as Crystal
 Alex Duda as Ronald

Reception
On Rotten Tomatoes the film has an approval rating of 60% based on reviews from 5 critics.

Christopher Null of Reel.com gave it 2.5/4 and described the film as "One hell of an oddity"
David Nusair of Reel Film gave the film 2.5/4, and comparing it to films like Scary Movie concluded "...you could certainly do worse."

See also
 100 Women (2002), a thematic sequel by the same writer/director. It had a short, limited release in theaters as Girl Fever before being released on DVD and movie channels as 100 Women.

References

External links
 
 

2000 films
2000 romantic comedy films
American romantic comedy films
American teen comedy films
2000s English-language films
Films about virginity
Films directed by Michael Davis
Films set in universities and colleges
Lionsgate films
Teen sex comedy films
2000s American films